Thompson Elk Fountain, also known as the David P. Thompson Fountain, David P. Thompson Monument, Elk Fountain, the Thompson Elk, or simply Elk, is a historic fountain and bronze sculpture by American artist Roland Hinton Perry. The fountain with its statue was donated to the city of Portland, Oregon, United States, in 1900 for display in Downtown Portland's Plaza Blocks. It is owned by the City of Portland.

The monument became a gathering place for demonstrations by George Floyd protesters, who lit several fires in the troughs along the base in July 2020. The damaged bronze elk statue was removed for cleaning and safekeeping on July 2, 2020. The stone fountain was removed on July 17, 2020, after RACC determined there was severe damage to the stone and basin of the fountain.

Description
Elk, formerly installed on Southwest Main between 3rd and 4th Avenues between Chapman Square and Lownsdale Square in Portland's Plaza Blocks, features a bronze sculpture of an elk, resting on a granite base within an octagon-shaped basin.

History

The monument was designed by Roland Hinton Perry, the sculptor of the Court of Neptune Fountain at the Library of Congress and Commonwealth, the statue atop the dome of the Pennsylvania State Capitol. The fountain and bronze sculpture was donated by former Portland mayor David P. Thompson in 1900 to commemorate the elk that once lived in the area.

The project was completed within a budget of $20,000 under the direction of designer E.G. Wright. Wright had planned to complete the monument in time for a Fourth of July dedication to coincide with a city street carnival, but delays from removing nearby trees, widening Main Street, and connecting city water pipe forced Wright to delay completion of the monument. The  Elk was lifted into position in late August, and the Thompson Fountain was finished the first week of September 1900. A carnival sponsored by the Portland Elks Club began that week, and The Oregonian informed its readers, "this is not a carnival elk." According to the city, the Exalted Order of Elks refused to dedicate it because they considered the statue "a monstrosity of art." A reporter for The Oregonian in 2020 explained that, "part of the problem might have been that [the Perry sculpture] didn't quite capture the animal found in Oregon's wilds," as it depicts neither an Olympic elk nor a Rocky Mountain elk.

In 1974, Thompson's Elk and the Plaza Blocks were designated as Historic Landmarks by the city's Historic Landmarks Commission, under the name David P. Thompson Fountain. The sculpture appeared in Gus Van Sant's 1991 film My Own Private Idaho, where the elk was shown with a rider on it. The artwork was surveyed by the Smithsonian Institution's "Save Outdoor Sculpture!" program in 1993. The sculpture appears on the cover art for Portland band Agalloch's 2002 record, The Mantle.

Vandalism and removal

The elk was vandalized many times. It was vandalized during the Occupy Portland protest (2011), and had its antlers repaired in early 2012. The statue was tagged with anti-Trump messages in 2016.

On July 1, 2020, during the George Floyd protests, people protesting police violence built bonfires in two planter boxes beneath the elk statue.  The resulting structural damage to the granite base supporting the sculpture was deemed a safety hazard by the Regional Arts & Culture Council (RACC).  The city removed the damaged bronze elk sculpture for cleaning on July 2. After RACC determined that the stone and basin of the fountain were severely damaged, it was removed on July 17. The status of the Elk fountain remained to be determined. Following the deployment of federal forces to Portland, it was reported that as of July 30, the bare mound where the statue once stood remained a site of activity, with demonstrators arguing for and against its continued use for bonfires.  In late August, the statue was being kept "safely in storage".

Reinstallation 
In February 2022, city officials confirmed plans to reinstall the statue on Main Street by early 2023.

See also

 1900 in art
 Elkhorn, Lee Kelly's 1979 deer sculpture at Portland's Catlin Gabel School
 Fountain for Company H (1914), also located in the Plaza Blocks
 List of monuments and memorials removed during the George Floyd protests
 Spanish–American War Soldier's Monument (1906), also located in the Plaza Blocks

References

External links

 Public Art Search: Elk, Regional Arts & Culture Council
 The Thompson Elk, after 111 years, has seen it all – including Occupy Portland by John Terry (November 19, 2011), The Oregonian
 Experts Critique Portland's Most Famous Public Art, by Joe Streckert (December 9, 1015), Portland Monthly

1900 establishments in Oregon
1900 sculptures
Animal monuments
Animal sculptures in Oregon
Bronze sculptures in Oregon
Deer in art
Fountains in Portland, Oregon
Granite sculptures in Oregon
Monuments and memorials in Portland, Oregon
Monuments and memorials removed during the George Floyd protests
Outdoor sculptures in Portland, Oregon
Plaza Blocks
Portland Historic Landmarks
Relocated buildings and structures in Oregon
Sculptures by Roland Hinton Perry
Statues in Portland, Oregon
Vandalized works of art in Oregon
Statues removed in 2020